Chaturvedi Badrinath was an Indian Administrative Service officer and author. His book The Mahabharata: An Inquiry in the Human Condition won the Sahitya Akademi Award in 2009.

He was born in Mainpuri, Uttar Pradesh in  August 1933 to Jang Bahadur Chaturvedi  and Lakshmi Devi. He died on 17 February 2010.

Works 
 Unity of Life and Other Essays, Edited by Tulsi Badrinath, Oxford University Press, 2016
 Swami Vivekananda: The Living Vedanta, Penguin, 2006
 The Women of Mahabharata: The Question of Truth, Orient BlackSwan, 2008
 The Mahabharata: An Inquiry in the Human Condition, Orient BlackSwan, 2006
 Finding Jesus in Dharma: Christianity in India, 2000
 Dharma, India and the World Order: Twenty-one Essays 1993

References

Writers from Uttar Pradesh
2010 deaths
1933 births